Carl-Axel Söderström (December 23, 1893 – November 27, 1976) was a Swedish photographer and cinematographer who accompanied Clärenore Stinnes on a two-year automobile journey around the world.

Biography

Söderström was born December 23, 1893 in Korsnäs, Sweden to a smith.

He was trained as a photographer in the Stockholm branch of the Pathé Brothers Company.

On November 25, 1923, in the German Church, Stockholm Söderström married the four years younger miss Gertrud Martha Vahl, born in Berlin to a German confectioner who had emigrated to Sweden with his wife and six children.

On May 25, 1927, Söderström started to journey around the world, as a photographer for Clärenore Stinnes, whom he had met only two days before their departure, in a mass production Adler Standard 6 automobile and escorted by two mechanics and a freight vehicle with spare parts and equipment. Stinnes' journey was sponsored by the German automotive industry (Adler, Bosch and Aral) with 100,000 Reichsmark.

After their happy return, Carl-Axel Söderström divorced Martha, who died in 1985 without children.

Söderström and Stinnes married in December 1930 and lived on an estate in Sweden, where they raised three children of their own and several foster children. In later years they spent some time of the year in Irmenach. Söderström died in 1976, aged 82, survived by Stinnes.

Partial filmography
 The Story of a Boy (1919)
 40 Skipper Street (1925)
 To the Orient (1926)

External links

References

1893 births
1976 deaths
20th-century Swedish people
Swedish photographers